Duzgin Baba ( or dial. Duzgın Bava, also Kemerê Duzgıni "the rock of Duzgın") is a religious figure among Alevi Kurds, especially in the Tunceli Province. He also symbolizes a mountain in Nazımiye, nearby the village Qil. The people believe that he disappeared at the top of this mountain, which is known as Kemerê Duzgıni (the rock of Duzgın), Bimbarek (holy) or Kemerê Bımbareki (holy rock) in Zazaki. According to local narrations he is the son of sayyid Kures/Kureş who was an ancestor of Kureşan community and his real name is not Duzgın, it is Haydar or Shah Haydar (Zaz. Sa Heyder). But some researches suggest the opposite of this view.

Story
Duzgi was known as a wali in Tunceli where he performed a miracle keramat ('miracle'). One winter the weather was very bad, bringing on a drought and the people were struggling to feed themselves let alone their animals. However, Duzgın's flock seemed healthy. His father was curious about how Duzgın kept them healthy. One day he followed him and saw that whenever Duzgın shook his staff over the dry earth plants began to grow and the flock fed on them. His father was about to leave unnoticed when one of the flock sneezed a few times and Duzgi said; "What's the matter? Did you see Kurêso Khurr and that's what made you sneeze?" At the same time, he turns round and catches sight of his father and than he runs to the top of the mountain. He disappeared 'divinely', out of shame of his father.

Etymology
Although the name Duzgın is like a Turkish word, it doesn't come from originally Turkish düzgün which means smooth and correct. The Turkification process of Alevi myths and beliefs in Tunceli has begun especially with some leaders of Bektashi order who have tried to get contact with local leaders of Alevi Kurds in the 19th century. Thus it is possible that in this time they added some new motifs to local myths to explain them with Turkish terms. Ağuçan, the name of another sayyid community may be an brilliant example. Because the most of people in the region still believe that it means 'someone who drink poison' (Turkish ağu içen) in Turkish, although it is a popular etymological view.
The name Duzgın and Dizgun are transformation of the name of another mythological figure in the region. He is Tujik/Tuzik which means sharp in Zazaki and Kurdish and it symbolizes also a mountain. Like Duzgın, he is a personification of a mountain, originally of an ancient god (Vahagn). According some songs of aşıks (ashik) he is the strongest veli (saint) in Tunceli. He is the head of 366 saints. Some scholars think that the name of Tujik comes from Armenian duzakh which means the hell among Zoroastrian Armenians. It may be a harmonized form to pronounces of new local languages. 
Tujik was originally a volcanic mountain. Therefore, the people gave this name. The Turks who live nearby the mountain, have same motivation to give name Cehennem dağı (the mountain Hell) to the mountain Tendürek. Because it is also a volcanic mountain and therefore sometimes the people heard roar from the mountain. Moreover, the etymological origin of the name of Tendürek indirectly refers to 'hell' as a metaphor. It is associated with the word of tandoor which means a kind of oven.

Origins
Some scholars thought that there is a continual association between Armenian Mithra (Mehr or Mihr) and Bava Duzgi/Dizgun Bava. Because the mountains of Tunceli was a shelter for Zoroastrian Armenian who have resisted the process of Christianisation in ancient times and there were cult places of the Zoroastrian divinities in the borderland of ancient 'Tunceli' . For example, Bagayaric (now Pekeriç, in Erzincan) was the cult place of Armenian Mithra. Kemah (Turkey) was for Ahuramazda (Armenian Ohrmazd). Therefore, it can be traced from some placenames in Tunceli. The most clear example is about the name of Mercan mountains which etymologically is connected with Mehr.

Not only place names, also mythological elements point to this continuity. First of all, Mithra was a god of the contracts and friendship. He protector of truth. Duzgi can resolve individual conflicts among Alevi Zazas and Kurds, also alevitized Armenians of Tunceli and he is also a protector of truth. If anyone has a problem (dava) with someone else and if he/she couldn't solve this problem with him/her, than he/she is going to the top of the mountain of Duzgın and he/she wish his help.

According to Alevi Zazas and Kurds of Tunceli, if a pious person doesn't have any son and if he/she go to the mountain of Bava Duzgın, Duzgın will give a chance to the person to get a son. Mithra is known as 'sons-giver' (putro-da) in Avesta. The people pray to Duzgi in the time of first lights of the rising sun, like Mithra's followers. Mithra has been turned a sun god in late times, although he was god of the sunlight.

Mithra and Duzgi are shepherds. Mithra is symbolized by an eagle. Duzgi has also such a symbol. It is Heliyo Chal. Both of them are cavalry and they are dressed in red. Moreover, Mithra has a sister (Anahita), Duzgi too (Xaskar). Anahita is a goddess of the water and she symbolizes the purity. Xaskar has a holy water source on the mountain of Duzgın. It is called by her name; Xaskare. If someone drink the water who has good heart, than the water source can't be dried. This belief refers to Anahita who means spotless in Avesta (An-ahit). The name of Xaskar probably comes from Armenian oskrhat which means 'made of the gold' in Armenian. Because Anahid is mostly described with the golden dressing. Consequently, Xaskar and Duzgın is a personifications of Armenian Anahita and Mithra in this mountainous region, Tunceli.

References

Mythology
Tunceli Province
Alevism
Kurdish culture